Taner Yıldız (born 23 December 1992) is a Turkish footballer who plays as a midfielder for Ağrı 1970 SK. He made his Süper Lig debut against Galatasaray on 9 May 2011.

References

External links
 
 

1992 births
People from Çeşme
Living people
Turkish footballers
Association football midfielders
Kasımpaşa S.K. footballers
İstanbulspor footballers
Bayrampaşaspor footballers
Pazarspor footballers
Fatih Karagümrük S.K. footballers
Diyarbakırspor footballers
Tuzlaspor players
Süper Lig players
TFF First League players
TFF Second League players
TFF Third League players